Tajima is a Japanese name that may refer to:

People
, Japanese population geneticist
, Japanese warrior monk
, Japanese baseball player
, Japanese print maker of the Sosaku Hanga School
, Japanese actress
, Japanese politician
, Japanese politician
, Japanese long jumper
, Japanese super centenarian
, Japanese athlete
, Japanese race car driver
, daughter of Emperor Tenmu of Japan
 Renee Tajima-Peña (born 1958), American film director and producer
, Japanese photographer
, Japanese swimmer
, Japanese actor

Characters
, a baseball player in the anime Big Windup!
Haruki Tajima/Yukine (雪音) Yato's Reagalia in the anime Noragami

Other meanings of Tajima
 Tajima, Fukushima, a town in Japan
 Tajima Airport
 Tajima cattle
 Tajima Group, a manufacturer of sewing and embroidery machinery
 Tajima Plateau Botanical Gardens
 Tajima Province, Japan
 Tajima's D, a statistical test
 Tajima-Mie Station

See also
 Tajima Station (disambiguation)

Japanese-language surnames